Jakob Tordsson Bagge (1 May 1502 – 14 January 1577) was a Norwegian born, Swedish admiral and nobleman.

Biography
Bagge was born  the son of Norwegian nobleman Thord Olofsson Bagge and his wife Ingeborg Jakobsdotter. Both he and his father were first in the military service of Denmark.   He entered Swedish military service for King Gustav Vasa in 1522. He  fought for Sweden in the Count's Feud of 1534–1536.  He  took part in the suppression of the rebellion of Nils Dacke in 1542. By the 1550s, Bagge was considered the most experienced of Sweden's admirals.  
He served with  Baron Klas Horn (1517– 1566) at Vyborg Castle during 1557. He participated in the battle against the Danish forces  at the Battle of Bornholm  on 30 May 1563. He subsequently fought in the Northern Seven Years' War of 1563–1570. 

He received his nobility from  King Eric XIV of Sweden and in 1559 his land possession was extended. He was associated with the estates Lännersta gård and Boo gård both in Nacka Municipality. He also held  Mem Castle (Mems slott) in  the parish of Tåby in  Norrköping Municipality.

References

External links 

1502 births
1577 deaths
Norwegian emigrants to Sweden
Swedish admirals
Swedish nobility
16th-century Swedish military personnel
People of the Northern Seven Years' War
People of the Count's Feud